The 2008 Utah Blaze season was the third season for this Arena Football League franchise. Despite losing their first nine games, the Blaze were able to finish the regular season with six wins in their last seven games, earning them a playoff berth as the fourth seed in the American Conference. In their wild card round game, however, they were defeated by the Colorado Crush, 44–49.

Standings

Regular season schedule

Playoff schedule

Staff

Final roster

Stats

Regular season

Week 1: at Utah Blaze

Week 2: at Cleveland Gladiators

Week 3: at Orlando Predators

Week 4: vs. Columbus Destroyers

Week 5: vs. Georgia Force

Week 6: at Philadelphia Soul

Week 7: at Los Angeles Avengers

Week 8: vs. San Jose SaberCats

Week 9: at New Orleans VooDoo

Week 10: vs. Kansas City Brigade

Week 11: vs. Colorado Crush

Week 12: at San Jose Sabercats

Week 13: vs. Chicago Rush

Week 14: at Grand Rapids Rampage

Week 15: vs. Los Angeles Avengers

Week 16
Bye Week

Week 17: at Arizona Rattlers

Playoffs

American Conference Wild Card: vs. (5) Colorado Crush

References

External links

Utah Blaze
Utah Blaze seasons
Utah